The 2015–16 Youngstown State Penguins men's basketball team represented Youngstown State University during the 2015–16 NCAA Division I men's basketball season. The Penguins, were led by eleventh year head coach Jerry Slocum, played their home games at the Beeghly Center and were members of the Horizon League. They finished the season 11–21, 6–12 in Horizon League play to finish in seventh place. They lost to Detroit in the first round of the Horizon League tournament.

Previous season 
The Penguins finished the 2014–15 season 11–21, 2–14 in Horizon League play to finish in ninth place. They lost to Detroit in the first round of the Horizon League tournament. After the 2014–15 season, guard Marcus Keene transferred to Central Michigan.

Roster

Schedule

|-
!colspan=9 style=| Non-conference regular season

|-
!colspan=9 style=| Horizon League regular season

|-
!colspan=9 style=|Horizon League tournament

References

Youngstown State Penguins men's basketball seasons
Youngstown
Youngstown State Penguins men's b
Youngstown State Penguins men's b